Apple Inc. announces major new and redesigned products and upgrades through press conferences, while minor updates often happen through press releases on Apple Newsroom. The press conferences garner a significant following in traditional and online media. The detailed agenda of the event is often kept as a secret to create buzz, and only unveiled during the event, though event taglines sometimes give hints. These events are usually streamed live on Apple's website and, in recent years, YouTube channel. Video replays of most Apple events since 2007 are available on Apple's "Apple Events" podcast.

Apple often announces new products at the annual Apple Worldwide Developers Conference (WWDC), despite it being mainly software-focused.

Venues
 Moscone West, San Francisco
 Yerba Buena Center for the Arts, San Francisco
 Bill Graham Civic Auditorium, San Francisco
 Flint Center, Cupertino
 McEnery Convention Center, San Jose
 Steve Jobs Theater (Apple Park), Cupertino
 Online (2020-present)

2005

WWDC 2005 (June 6–10, 2005) 
After a basic market update, Jobs announced that Apple would transition the Macintosh platform to Intel x86 processors after using PowerPC for more than a decade. The keynote featured developers from Wolfram Research, who discussed their experience porting Mathematica to Mac OS X on the Intel platform. The conference consisted of 110 lab sessions and 95 presentation sessions, while more than 500 Apple engineers were on site alongside 3,800 attendees from 45 countries. The band The Wallflowers played at the Apple campus.

2006

Macworld 2006 (January 10, 2006) 
At the event, Apple introduced its first Intel-based computers, the iMac and MacBook Pro.

Apple Special Event (February 28, 2006) 
At the Apple Special Event on February 28, 2006, Steve Jobs announced the iPod Hi-Fi speaker system at the Town Hall conference center in Cupertino.

WWDC 2006 (August 7–11, 2006) 
In 2006, Steve Jobs once again delivered the keynote presentation at the WWDC, which was held from August 7 to August 11 in Moscone Center West, San Francisco. The Mac Pro was announced as a replacement for the Power Mac G5, which was Apple's prior pro desktop computer and the last remaining PowerPC-based Mac. The standard Mac Pro featured two 2.66 GHz dual core Xeon (Woodcrest) processors, 1 GB RAM, 250 GB hard drive, and a 256 MB video card. An Xserve update, based on the dual core Xeons, was also announced. Redundant power and Lights Out Management were further product improvements to Apple's server lineup. While certain key Mac OS X improvements were undisclosed, there were 10 improvements in the next iteration, Mac OS X Leopard (10.5), including: full 64-bit app support, Time Machine, Boot Camp, Front Row, Photo Booth, Spaces (Virtual Desktops), Spotlight enhancements, Core Animation, Universal Access enhancements, Mail enhancements, and Dashboard enhancements (including Dashcode), and iChat enhancements. Along with the Leopard features that were announced, a major revision to the Mac OS X Server product was announced. New features to the Server included: a simplified set-up process, iCal Server (based on the CalDAV standard), Apple Teams (a set of web-based collaborative services), Spotlight Server, and Podcast Producer. The 2006 WWDC attracted 4,200 developers from 48 countries, while there were 140 sessions and 100 hands-on labs for developers. More than 1,000 Apple engineers were present at the event, and the DJ BT performed at the Apple Campus in Cupertino.

Apple Special Event (September 12, 2006) 
Apple announced the Apple TV (code-named iTV at the time) at this event, along with refreshes to their iPod lineup.

2007

Macworld Conference & Expo San Francisco 2007 (Tuesday, January 9, 2007) 
Venue: Moscone West, San Francisco, California

Host: Steve Jobs, Apple's CEO

Presenters:

 Phil Schiller, Senior Vice President Worldwide Product Marketing, Apple Inc.
Dr. Eric Schmidt, CEO, Google
Jerry Yang, Co-Founder and Chief Yahoo!, Yahoo!
Stan Sigman, CEO, Cingular

Podcast Episode Description: "Watch Apple CEO Steve Jobs kick off the Macworld Conference & Expo 2007 with a keynote address from San Francisco's Moscone West. Check out the exciting new developments at Apple, which include the addition of Paramount movies to iTunes, Apple TV, which allows you to wirelessly play all of your iTunes content from your Mac or PC on your television, and the pioneering iPhone. This revolutionary product is a widescreen iPod with touch controls, a mobile phone, and an Internet communications device all in one."

Notable Information: 

 One year after the announcement of the transition from PowerPC to Intel processors Jobs calls the transition "the smoothest and most successful transition that we've ever seen in the history of our industry". 
 Jobs announces that over half of all new Mac sales are to "switchers" - users who have never before owned a Mac.
 Ad: "I'm a Mac, I'm a PC" ad about Windows upgrading to Vista.
 Jobs announces the iPod has become "the world's most popular video player" and the iPod nano is "the world's most popular MP3 player" and the iPod shuffle is "the world's most wearable MP3 player".
 2 billion (cumulative) songs purchased and downloaded from iTunes.
 5 million songs purchased and downloaded every day from iTunes.
 Apple becomes the 4th largest retailer of music behind Walmart, Best Buy, and Target - pulling ahead of Amazon.
 Over 350 TV shows now offered on iTunes with 50 million TV shows purchased and downloaded. 1.3 million movies purchased and downloaded.
 Jobs announces Paramount will join as a partner to sell movies on iTunes. A total of 250 movies now offered on iTunes. 
 Jobs announces that as of November 2006 NPD reports iPod has 62% share of portable music device market share.
 Ads: 2 versions of iPod "silhouette" commercial featuring Flathead by The Fratellis. 
 Update on Apple TV (formerly iTV) with demo. Priced at $299 and set to ship the following month ("February"). Orders available following the keynote.
 Introduction of the iPhone, "a revolutionary product that changes everything". "Today Apple is going to reinvent the phone."
 Introduction of "Multi-Touch", a patented user interface used on the iPhone.
First iPhone 4 GB model to launch at $499 with a 2 year contract. 8 GB model to launch at $599 with a 2 year contract.
First iPhones to ship in the United States in June.
Apple partnering with Cingular as an exclusive partner for the iPhone.
 Renaming of "Apple Computer, Inc" to "Apple Inc." to recognize the shift from being a computer company to a broader technology company.

The following day, Apple shares hit $97.80, an all-time high at that point. In May, Apple's share price passed the $100 mark.

WWDC 2007 (June 11–15, 2007) 

WWDC 2007 was held from June 11 to June 15. During the event, Apple announced the release of iPhone OS 1, as well as iPhone (1st generation).

Special Event 2007 (August 7, 2007) 

Apple presented new Aluminum Intel-based iMacs.

Apple Music Event 2007 (September 5, 2007) 
The event was called "The Beat Goes On". Apple announced the first generation iPod touch.

2008

Macworld Conference & Expo San Francisco 2008 (Wednesday, January 16, 2008) 
Venue: Moscone West, San Francisco, California

Host: Steve Jobs, Apple's CEO

Presenters:

 Jim Gianopulos, Chairman & CEO, 20th Century Fox
Paul Otellini, CEO, Intel

Podcast Episode Description: "Watch Apple CEO Steve Jobs kick off the Macworld Conference & Expo 2008 with a keynote address that covers exciting developments at Apple, including the MacBook Air and the addition of movie rentals to iTunes and on Apple TV."

Notable Information:

 Ad: "I'm a Mac, I'm a PC" ad about 2007, PC's plans for 2008.
 Jobs reports 5 million copies of Mac OS X Leopard were delivered in first 3 months. 19% of Mac OS X user base on Leopard, 81% percent still on Tiger. 
 Microsoft has begun shipping Microsoft Office for Mac 2008.
 Jobs introduced Time Capsule, a wireless Time Machine back-up appliance based on and including AirPort Extreme. 2 models will ship: 500 GB at $299, 1 TB at $499. Will ship in February.
 Ad: "I'm a Mac, I'm a PC" ad about Time Machine. 
 Jobs reports 4 million iPhones have sold in the 200 days they've been shipping.
 Gartner report for Q3 2007 shows iPhone #2 (19.5%) in US SmartPhone Marketshare, behind RIM (Blackberry) (39.0%).
 Jobs mentions the Software Developer Kit (SDK) for iPhone.
 Jobs spoke to new features in iPhone software release that was released day-of. iPod Touch to get new apps and software update for $20.
 Apple has sold over 4 billion songs on iTunes. 20 million songs sold on Christmas Day.
 Apple has sold over 125 million TV shows on iTunes.
 Apple has sold over 7 million movies on iTunes.
 Jobs introduced iTunes movie rentals. Launching with over 1000 movies. New movies available 30 days after DVD release. Rentals between $2.99 and $3.99. 
 Jobs introduced an updated Apple TV "Take 2", a free software upgrade, that no longer required a computer. Price dropped from $299 to $229. 
Jobs introduced the MacBook Air - "the world's thinnest notebook". MacBook Air launched with an 80 GB HDD standard or an optional 64 GB SSD. MacBook Air will launch at $1799. Shipping starts 2 weeks from the keynote.
Ad: MacBook Air "envelope" ad featuring New Soul by Yael Naïm.
Jobs gave updates on Apple's commitment to being more environmentally responsible.

iPhone Software Roadmap Event (March 6, 2008) 

Apple announced push technology in iPhone OS, the iPhone SDK and iPhoneOS 2.0.

WWDC 2008 (June 9–13, 2008) 
Announcements at the keynote included the App Store for iPhone and iPod Touch, the stable version of the iPhone SDK, a subsidized 3G version of the iPhone for Worldwide markets, version 2.0 of iPhone OS, Mac OS X Snow Leopard (10.6), and the replacement/rebranding of .Mac as MobileMe.

Apple Special Event (September 9, 2008) 
Updates on iTunes and music from Jobs, retirement of the larger form-factor iPod Classic with hard drive capacity increased on the remaining iPod Classic, and a new iPod Nano. At this event Jobs also joked "the reports of my death are greatly exaggerated".

2009

WWDC 2009 (June 8–12, 2009) 
Announcements at the keynote included the release of the iPhone OS 3.0 software announced to developers in March, a demonstration of Mac OS X Snow Leopard (10.6), the new 13" MacBook Pro, updates to the 15" and 17" MacBook Pros, and the new iPhone 3GS.

Apple Special Event (September 9, 2009) 
Announcements at the keynote included the release of iTunes 9, ability to purchase Ringtones for iPhone, iTunes LP, the 5th-generation iPod nano, 3rd-generation iPod touch, and a thinner 160GB 6th-generation iPod classic.

2010

Apple Special Event (January 27, 2010) 
The iPad was announced on January 27, 2010, by Steve Jobs at an Apple press conference at the Yerba Buena Center for the Arts in San Francisco.

Jobs later said that Apple began developing the iPad before the iPhone, but temporarily shelved the effort upon realizing that its ideas would work just as well in a mobile phone. The iPad's internal codename was K48, which was revealed in the court case surrounding leaking of iPad information before launch.

Apple Special Event (April 8, 2010) 

Apple revealed iOS 4 (then known as iPhone OS 4). In Apple's description, it includes "over 100 new user features for iPhone and iPod Touch owners to enjoy. And for developers, a new software development kit (SDK) offers over 1500 new APIs to create apps that are even more powerful, innovative, and amazing."

WWDC 2010 (June 7–11, 2010) 
On June 7, 2010, Jobs announced the iPhone 4. Also, iPhone OS was renamed to iOS. The FaceTime and iMovie app for iPhone applications were also announced.

Apple Special Event (September 1, 2010) 
Steve Jobs opened iOS 4.1, iOS 4.2 Preview, 4th gen Shuffle, 6th gen Nano, 4th gen iPod Touch, iTunes 10 with Ping. and 2nd gen Apple TV.

2011

Apple Special Event (March 2, 2011) 
Apple sent invitations to journalists on February 23, 2011, for a media event on March 2. Apple CEO Steve Jobs revealed the iPad 2 device at the Yerba Buena Center for the Arts on March 2, 2011, despite being on medical leave.

WWDC 2011 (June 6–10, 2011) 
Apple unveiled Mac OS X Lion, iOS 5, the cloud service iCloud and iTunes Match.

This keynote was not streamed live.

Apple Special Event (October 4, 2011) 
On October 4, 2011, Apple held a media event in which it introduced Find My Friends, refreshed the iPod Nano and iPod Touch, and revealed the iPhone 4s with its all-new Siri voice assistant.

2012

Apple Special Event (March 7, 2012) 
On February 28, 2012, Apple announced a media event scheduled for March 7, 2012, at the Yerba Buena Center. Apple didn't disclose in advance what would be announced at the event, but it was widely expected to be a new version of the iPad.  It was also rumored that Apple might release a new television set top box.  The announcement affected the tablet resale market, and Apple's stock price reached a record closing figure on the same day that the Dow Jones Industrial Average reached a closing figure of above 13,000 for the first time since the Global Financial Crisis.  (Apple is not a Dow Jones component.)

The keynote began 10 AM PST (18:00 UTC) with Cook introducing iOS 5.1, a Japanese version of Siri, and the 3rd generation Apple TV before the 3rd generation iPad. Eddy Cue gave a demo of the new Apple TV interface. At the media event, Cook talked about a 'post-PC world', a world where the personal computer is no longer the center of one's digital life, and of how the 3rd generation iPad will be one of the main contributors of the 'post-PC world'.

WWDC 2012 (June 11–15, 2012) 

WWDC 2012 was held in Moscone Center West from June 11 to June 15. The ticket price remained the same as the 2010 WWDC, selling at US$1,599. Apple changed the purchasing process by requiring purchases to be made using an Apple ID associated with a paid Apple developer account. Tickets went on sale shortly after 8:30am Eastern Time on Wednesday April 25, 2012, and were sold out within 1 hour and 43 minutes. The keynote highlighted the launch of Apple Maps, and also announced new models of the MacBook Air and MacBook Pro including one with Retina Display. Apple also showcased OS X Mountain Lion and iOS 6.

In prior years, attendees were required to be at least 18 years old. In 2012, Apple changed this requirement to at least 13 years after a minor who was "accidentally" awarded a student scholarship in 2011 successfully petitioned Tim Cook to retain the award. Despite the change, Beer Bash attendees were still required to be 18 years old, and 21 years old to consume alcohol, in accord with local and federal laws. Neon Trees performed at the WWDC Bash.

This keynote was streamed live exclusively on iOS devices and OS X, through the Safari web browser on June 11, 2012.

Apple Special Event (September 12, 2012) 
Phil Schiller, Apple's senior vice president of worldwide marketing, took the wraps off the new iPhone for press gathered at the company's San Francisco event, calling the device "the most beautiful product we've ever made, bar none." The iPhone 5 is made entirely of glass and aluminum, Schiller said, adding that the "exacting level of standards" exhibited by the phone is Apple's best hardware engineering to date.

It's the thinnest and lightest iPhone, at 7.6mm thin, and 112 grams. Schiller said those measurements make it the world's thinnest smartphone. The iPhone 5 was also volumetrically smaller than the previous model, the iPhone 4S.

Apple Special Event (October 23, 2012) 
On October 23, Apple CEO Tim Cook unveiled the new iPad Mini, fourth generation iPad with Retina display, new iMac, and the 13-inch MacBook Pro with Retina display.

2013

WWDC 2013 (June 10–14, 2013) 
In 2013, WWDC 2013 was held from June 10 to June 14 at Moscone West in San Francisco – the same venue as in previous years. Tickets went on sale at 10am PDT on April 25, 2013, selling out within 71 seconds (1 minute and 11 seconds). Apple also announced that it will award 150 free WWDC 2013 Student Scholarship tickets to those who want to attend in order to benefit from the conference's many workshops, with applications for a scholarship starting 9am PDT on April 29, 2013, and deadline slated for 5pm PDT on May 2, 2013. Winning applicants were notified by May 16, 2013, though Apple states that it won't reimburse winners for travel or hotel expenses. In the keynote, Apple unveiled a redesigned model of the Mac Pro, AirPort Time Capsule, and AirPort Extreme as well as updated models of the MacBook Air.  Apple also showcased OS X Mavericks, iOS 7, iWork for iCloud and a new music streaming service named iTunes Radio. Vampire Weekend performed at the Bash on June 13 at the Yerba Buena Gardens.

This keynote was streamed live on June 10, 2013.

Apple Special Event (September 10, 2013) 
Apple announced the iPhone 5C and iPhone 5S during a media event called "This should brighten everyone's day." at its Cupertino headquarters on September 10, 2013. While the iPhone 5C became available for preorder on September 13, 2013, the iPhone 5S first became available on September 20, 2013. While most of the promotion focused on Touch ID, the 64-bit Apple A7 was also a highlight during the event:

Schiller then showed demos of Infinity Blade III to demonstrate the A7's processing power and the iPhone 5S camera using unretouched photographs. The release of iOS 7 on September 18, 2013, was also announced during the keynote.

Apple Special Event (October 22, 2013) 
Apple held a second Fall event in 2013 under the name of "We still have a lot to cover". This event saw the unveiling of the iPad Air, the second-generation iPad mini with Retina display, and updates to the MacBook Pro line. Tim Cook also announced that OS X Mavericks would be available for free.

2014

WWDC 2014 (June 2–6, 2014) 
At Moscone West, Apple presented the new version of OS X named Yosemite as well as the new iOS version, iOS 8. The biggest news however was the completely new programming language for Mac and iOS called Swift.

This keynote was streamed live on June 2, 2014.

Apple Special Event (September 9, 2014) 
Presented on the "Wish we could say more" event was the most anticipated iPhone 6 and 6 Plus as well as a new payment system called Apple Pay. Also, the Apple Watch, the company's first smartwatch, was introduced. The event took place at Flint Center, in Cupertino.

Apple Special Event (October 16, 2014) 

Apple's "It's been way too long" media event took place on October 16, 2014. The company used this event to unveil the iPad Air 2, iPad mini 3, and an updated iMac with a 5K Retina Display.

This keynote was streamed live on October 16, 2014.

2015

Apple Special Event (March 9, 2015) 
Apple Special Event 2015 had the tagline "Spring Forward" and was broadcast live from Cupertino on Apple's website on March 9, 2015. It announced the release date and pricing for the anticipated Apple Watch, the MacBook's fourth redesign and iOS 8.2's same day release.  Apple also announced ResearchKit, a library designed to enable researchers to make study applications where participants can download them on their phones, electronic enroll & consent, and send survey and sensor data.  Five launch studies were introduced, including My Heart Counts, which enrolled over 11,000 participants in a single day.

WWDC 2015 (June 8–12, 2015) 
WWDC 2015 was held from June 8 to June 12 in Moscone Center West in San Francisco. The major announcements were the new features of iOS 9, the next version of OS X called OS X El Capitan, the first major software update to the Apple Watch, the June 30 debut of Apple Music, and news that the programming language Swift was becoming open-source software supporting iOS, OS X, and Linux. The Beer Bash was held at the Yerba Buena Gardens on June 11. Walk the Moon performed there.

This keynote was streamed live on June 8, 2015.

Apple Special Event (September 9, 2015) 

The "Hey Siri, give us a hint" event was held at the 7,000-seat Bill Graham Civic Auditorium in San Francisco. Apple announced and previewed watchOS 2 with native apps; the long-anticipated Apple TV update - with App Store, Siri Remote and tvOS; iPhone 6S and iPhone 6S Plus with the Apple A9, 3D Touch, 12MP camera; iOS 9 update coming September 16;  and iPad Mini 4 together with iPad Pro with 12.9" Retina display, optional keyboard/cover, and the Apple Pencil stylus. OneRepublic performed at the event.

This keynote was streamed live on September 9, 2015. For the first time, Windows users were able to watch it live using Microsoft Edge, the native Windows 10 browser.

2016

Apple Special Event (March 21, 2016) 
Apple invited the press media for its event "Let us loop you in" on March 21, 2016 in their own theatre "Town Hall" (at 1 Infinite Loop).  iPad Pro (9.7-inch), the first-generation iPhone SE, CareKit and updates to Apple Watch, HealthKit, ResearchKit and tvOS were released.

WWDC 2016 (June 13–17, 2016) 
Apple invited the press media and developers for its event on June 13, 2016 at Moscone West to unveil new versions of iOS, watchOS, tvOS, and macOS, a revamped Apple Music design, and the Swift Playgrounds app - a learning tool for programming.

This keynote was streamed live on June 13, 2016.

Apple Special Event (September 7, 2016) 
Apple hosted a media event on September 7, 2016 with the invitation's tagline "See you on the 7th". iPhone 7 and 7 Plus were announced at the event along with Apple's new wireless AirPods. iOS 10, watchOS 3 and tvOS 10 were released six days later. Sia performed at the event.

Apple Special Event (October 27, 2016) 
Apple hosted another media event on October 27, 2016 with the tagline "hello again". A new generation of MacBook Pro and a new TV app was announced at the event.

2017

WWDC 2017 (June 5–9, 2017)

The 2017 Apple WWDC was held from June 5 to June 9 in San Jose, California at its Convention Center. There were multiple hardware announcements at the event. Software announcements included iOS 11, watchOS 4, tvOS 11 and macOS High Sierra. An all-new second generation iPad Pro model was introduced with thinner bezels and a 10.5-inch screen size. It acquired many of the specs from the iPhone 7 and an A10X chip. The iPad Pro 12.9-inch was also refreshed with updated internals. Apple previewed several new Mac models, such as the MacBook, MacBook Pro, iMac, and an all-new iMac Pro. Apple's final announcement was HomePod.

Apple Special Event (September 12, 2017) 

Apple hosted a media event on September 12, 2017, with the tagline "Let's meet at our place". The tagline was a reference to Apple holding its first-ever event at the newly completed Steve Jobs Theater in the Apple Park campus. At the event, Apple Watch Series 3, Apple TV 4K, iPhone 8 and 8 Plus, and iPhone X were announced at the event. iOS 11, watchOS 4 and tvOS 11 were released a week later.

2018

Apple Special Event (March 27, 2018)
Apple hosted a media event on March 27, 2018 at the Lane Technical College Prep High School in Chicago. The 2018 iPad was announced at the education-focused event.

WWDC 2018 (June 4–8, 2018)
WWDC 2018 was held from June 4 to June 8 at the San Jose Convention Center in California. The announcements at the event included iOS 12, macOS Mojave, watchOS 5, and tvOS 12. Panic! at the Disco performed at the Bash at Discovery Meadow Park.

Apple Special Event (September 12, 2018)
Apple hosted another media event on September 12, 2018, with the tagline "Gather round". It was held at the Steve Jobs Theater in the Apple Park campus. The Apple Watch Series 4, the iPhone XS and XS Max, and the iPhone XR were announced at the event. iOS 12, watchOS 5 and tvOS 12 were released five days later.

Apple Special Event (October 30, 2018)
Apple hosted another media event on October 30, 2018, with the tagline "There's more in the making." It was held at the Brooklyn Academy of Music in Brooklyn, New York City. The new MacBook Air 2018 model, Mac Mini 2018 model, and the 11-inch and 12.9-inch third generation iPad Pro were announced at the event.

The event closed with a live performance of Lana Del Rey singing How to Disappear and an edited version of Venice Bitch from her upcoming album Norman Fucking Rockwell!

2019

Apple Special Event (March 25, 2019)
Apple hosted a media event on March 25, 2019, with the tagline "It's show time." It was held at the Steve Jobs Theater in the Apple Park campus. Apple News+, Apple Card, Apple Arcade and Apple TV+ were announced at this event.

WWDC 2019 (June 3–7, 2019)

WWDC 2019 was held from June 3 to June 7 at the San Jose Convention Center in California. At the keynote that kicked off the event, Apple announced iOS 13, iPadOS, macOS Catalina, tvOS 13, watchOS 6, a redesigned Mac Pro, the Pro Display XDR, and the new SwiftUI framework.

WWDC19 hosted over 5,500 attendees, including 350 winners of Apple’s student challenge. For the latter, a separate “Scholarship Kickoff” was organized on June 2, before the conference start.

Weezer performed at the “Bash” meetup organized as part of WWDC at Discovery Meadow (located about half a kilometer from the convention center).

Apple Special Event (September 10, 2019)

Apple hosted a special event on September 10, 2019, with the tagline "By innovation only." It was held at the Steve Jobs Theater in the Apple Park campus. Apple TV+ updates, Apple Watch Series 5, iPhone 11, iPhone 11 Pro and 11 Pro Max, and the 7th generation iPad were announced at the event. iOS 13 and watchOS 6 were released nine days later. iPadOS and tvOS 13 were also released the following five days.

The event was streamed live on YouTube for the first time, in addition to the usual streaming on Apple's website and through an Apple TV channel.

2020

WWDC 2020 (June 22–26, 2020)

WWDC 2020 was held from June 22 to June 26. Due to the COVID-19 pandemic, the entire event took place as a virtual conference for the first time. The announcements at the online special event keynote on June 22 included iOS 14, iPadOS 14, watchOS 7, tvOS 14, macOS Big Sur and the Mac transition to Apple silicon. The keynote was recorded at Apple Park in Cupertino, California.

Apple Event (September 15, 2020)
An Apple Event was held on September 15, 2020, with the tagline "Time flies." It took place as a virtual event, pre-recorded at Apple Park. Amongst the many announcements include the Apple Watch Series 6, the Apple Watch SE, the fourth-generation iPad Air, and the eighth-generation iPad. iOS 14, iPadOS 14, watchOS 7 and tvOS 14 were released a day later.

Apple Event (October 13, 2020) 
An Apple Event was held on October 13, 2020, with the tagline "Hi, Speed." It also took place as a virtual event at Apple Park, just like the previous one held on September 15. The HomePod mini, iPhone 12 mini, iPhone 12, iPhone 12 Pro, and iPhone 12 Pro Max were announced at the event. Preorders for iPhone 12 and iPhone 12 Pro began on October 16 and shipping began on October 23. The iPhone 12 mini and iPhone 12 Pro Max were available for preorder on November 6, and started shipping on November 13. Verizon CEO Hans Vestberg appeared alongside Tim Cook to discuss 5G.

Apple Event (November 10, 2020) 
An Apple Event was held on November 10, 2020, with the tagline "One more thing." It also took place as a virtual event at Apple Park, just like the previous two held on September 15 and October 13. It focused on the Apple M1, the new Apple silicon chip, and the new Apple silicon-powered models of the MacBook Air, Mac mini, and 13" MacBook Pro. macOS Big Sur was released two days later. John Hodgman appeared in a cameo at the end of the event.

2021

Apple Event (April 20, 2021)
An Apple Event was held on April 20, 2021, with the tagline "Spring Loaded." It also took place as a virtual event at Apple Park, just like the previous three held on September 15, October 13 and November 10, 2020. It revealed a new iPad Pro and iMac with the Apple M1 chip, Apple TV 4K, AirTag, and a new purple color option for iPhone 12 and 12 Mini, and announced new features for iOS 14.7.

WWDC 2021 (June 7–11, 2021)
WWDC 2021 was held from June 7 to June 11. As with the previous WWDC in 2020, it took place as a virtual event, with its keynote pre-recorded at Apple Park. The announcements at the online special event keynote on June 7 included iOS 15, iPadOS 15, watchOS 8, tvOS 15 and macOS Monterey.

Apple Event (September 14, 2021)
An Apple Event was held on September 14, 2021 with the tagline "California streaming." It also took place as a virtual event at Apple Park and at locations across California, much like the previous two held on April 20 and June 7. During the event, it revealed the new iPad with the Apple A13 chip, the new iPad mini with the Apple A15 chip, the Apple Watch Series 7, and the iPhone 13 mini, iPhone 13, iPhone 13 Pro, and iPhone 13 Pro Max. iOS 15, iPadOS 15, watchOS 8, and tvOS 15 were released six days later. Pre-orders for iPhone 13, iPhone 13 mini, iPhone 13 Pro, and iPhone 13 Pro Max began on September 17 and shipping began on September 24.

Apple Event (October 18, 2021)
An Apple Event was held on October 18, 2021 with the tagline "Unleashed." It again took place as a virtual event and was livestreamed from Apple Park. During the event, Apple announced an Apple Music Voice Plan, new color options for HomePod mini (blue, yellow, and orange, which became available in November), AirPods (3rd generation), and new MacBook Pro 14" and 16". MacOS Monterey was released a week later. The new MacBook models have a new design, bringing back previously removed ports, and are powered by Apple's M1 Pro and M1 Max processors, which replaced the Intel processors in the previous 16" model.

2022

Apple Event (March 8, 2022)
An Apple Event was held on March 8, 2022 with the tagline "Peek Performance" at 10 a.m. PST. It was once again held as a virtual event. A new iPhone SE with 5G capabilities and an enhanced camera was announced. Pre-orders for the new iPhone SE began on March 11, 2022 and shipping began on March 18, 2022. New "Green/Alpine Green" color options for the iPhone 13 and iPhone 13 Pro were also announced. A new iPad Air with the M1 SoC and 5G was announced as well in the event, along with the Mac Studio, which introduces the M1 Ultra SoC along with the Mac, as well as a new dedicated monitor that is meant for the desktop computer, the Studio Display. It is the first Apple-branded consumer monitor since the discontinuation of the Apple Thunderbolt Display and is not to be confused with the  “Apple Studio Display (1998-2004)” series. It features a design reminiscent to the Pro Display XDR, but it sits below the level of the professional monitor display bundled with the 3rd generation Mac Pro.

WWDC 2022 (June 6–10, 2022)
WWDC 2022 was held from June 6 to June 10. Just like WWDC 2020, held from June 22 to June 26, and WWDC 2021, held from June 7 to June 11, it also took place as a virtual event, although there was a special day at Apple Park on June 6, allowing developers and students to watch the online events together. Software announcements at the online special event keynote on June 6 included iOS 16, iPadOS 16, watchOS 9, tvOS 16 and macOS Ventura. Hardware announcements included the M2 chip and two Macs based on it, a redesigned MacBook Air and an updated 13-inch MacBook Pro.

After two years of online only events due to the COVID-19 Pandemic, WWDC 2022 was the first in-person Apple Event since WWDC 2019. The opening keynote was still pre-recorded, with a limited number of developers and members of the press invited to Apple Park. The viewing occurred at Caffè Macs inside Apple Park, with seating extending outside.

Apple Event (September 7, 2022)
Apple announced an event on August 24, 2022 with the tagline "Far out". It took place as an in-person event at the Steve Jobs Theater on September 7, 2022 at 10 a.m. PDT, making it the first event conducted in-person since the September 10, 2019 event.
It also took place as a virtual event at Apple Park and at locations across California, just like the previous one held on March 8. During the event, it revealed the Apple Watch Series 8, the second-generation Apple Watch SE, the new Apple Watch Ultra, the second-generation AirPods Pro, the iPhone 14 and iPhone 14 Plus with the Apple A15 chip, and the iPhone 14 Pro and iPhone 14 Pro Max with the Apple A16 chip. Preorders for iPhone 14, iPhone 14 Plus, iPhone 14 Pro, and iPhone 14 Pro Max began on September 9; shipping for iPhone 14, iPhone 14 Pro, and iPhone 14 Pro Max began on September 16, while shipping for iPhone 14 Plus began on October 7. iOS 16, watchOS 9, and tvOS 16 were released on September 12.

See also 

 Apple Inc. advertising
 Apple Worldwide Developers Conference
 Macworld/iWorld
 Stevenote

References 

Media events